Return of the Griffin is an album by saxophonist Johnny Griffin which was recorded in 1978 and released on the Galaxy label in the following year.

Reception

The AllMusic review by Scott Yanow stated: "Johnny Griffin recorded this studio album during his first visit to the United States in 15 years. ... Long one of the underrated masters, Johnny Griffin is heard at the peak of his powers on this modern bop session".

Track listing
All compositions by Johnny Griffin except s indicated.
 "Autumn Leaves" (Joseph Kosma, Johnny Mercer, Jacques Prévert) – 5:36
 "When We Were One" – 7:42
 "A Monk's Dream" – 6:18
 "The Way It Is" – 5:09
 "Fifty-Six" – 9:29
 "I Should Care" (Axel Stordahl, Paul Weston, Sammy Cahn) – 5:26

Personnel
Johnny Griffin – tenor saxophone
Ronnie Mathews – piano
Ray Drummond – bass
Keith Copeland – drums

References

1979 albums
Galaxy Records albums
Johnny Griffin albums
Albums produced by Orrin Keepnews